Shlomi Constantini, M.D., M.Sc., is the head of the Department of Pediatric Neurosurgery at Dana Children's Hospital, Tel Aviv Medical Center, Israel. A full clinical professor at Tel Aviv University, he is also the director of the Gilbert International Neurofibromatosis Center. Constantini first trained in Hadassah Medial Center, Jerusalem and sub-specialized in pediatric neurosurgery in New York University with Fred Epstein.

Constantini holds several leadership positions in international neurosurgical associations such as the past President of the IFNE, past General Secretary of the ISPN, past President of ISPN 2018 and past Vice president of the EANS.

Constantini has published over 300 scientific publications and serves on the editorial board of many medical journals.

Constantini’s main clinical interest and expertise is in the treatment of complex brain and spinal cord tumors, neuro-endoscopy and congenital malformations. As the head of the largest department of its kind in Israel and the Middle East, he treats international patients referred to him from all over the world.

References

External links 
 Department of Pediatric Neurosurgery at Tel Aviv Medical Center

Living people
Israeli neurosurgeons
Year of birth missing (living people)